This is a list of diplomatic missions of Cameroon, excluding honorary consulates. Cameroon has an extensive network of diplomatic missions, reflecting strong ties and non-contentious standing with other African states, its special relationships with France, the United States, Russia, and China, and its unique position of being both a member of the Commonwealth of Nations and Francophonie.

Africa

Algiers (Embassy)

Bangui (Embassy)
Bouar (Consulate)

N'Djamena (Embassy)

Brazzaville (Embassy)
Ouesso (Consulate)

 Kinshasa (Embassy)

Cairo (Embassy)

Malabo (Embassy)
Bata (Consulate)
Mongomo (Consulate) 

Addis Ababa (Embassy)

Abidjan (Embassy)

Libreville (Embassy)

Nairobi (Consulate-General) 

Monrovia (Embassy)

Rabat (Embassy)

Abuja (High Commission)
Lagos (Consulate-General)
Calabar (Consulate)

Dakar (Embassy)

Pretoria (High Commission)

Tunis (Embassy)

Americas

Brasília (Embassy)

Ottawa (High Commission)

Washington, D.C. (Embassy)

Asia

Beijing (Embassy)

Tel Aviv (Embassy)

Tokyo (Embassy)

Seoul (Embassy) 

Kuwait City (Consulate-General) 

Riyadh (Embassy)

Ankara (Embassy)

Dubai (Consulate General)

Europe

Brussels (Embassy)

Paris (Embassy)
Marseille (Consulate)

Berlin (Embassy)

Rome (Embassy)

Rome (Embassy)

The Hague (Embassy)

Moscow (Embassy)

Madrid (Embassy)

Berne (Embassy)
Geneva (Consulate-General)

London (High Commission)

Multilateral organisations

Addis Ababa (Permanent Mission)
 International Civil Aviation Organization
Montreal (Delegation)

New York City (Permanent Mission)
Geneva (Permanent Mission)

Paris (Permanent Mission)

Gallery

See also
Foreign relations of Cameroon
List of diplomatic missions in Cameroon
Visa policy of Cameroon

Notes

References

Sources
Cameroun - Ambassades et Consulats Camerounais à l’Etranger
 Nomination - Ambassadeur du Cameroun en Turquie
 Consulat Général du Cameroun à Genève
 Cameroun - Consulat Général du Cameroun à Lagos
 Cameroun - Consulat du Cameroun à Doubaï
 Cameroun - Consulat du Cameroun à Nairobi
 Cameroun - Consulat du Cameroun à Ouesso (République du Congo)
 Ouverture d’un Consulat de la République du Cameroun à Ouesso (République du Congo)
 Ouverture d’un Consulat du Cameroun à Ouesso (République du Congo)
 Le Consulat de la République du Cameroun à Ouesso, inauguré par le Ministre des Relations Extérieures ce 31 octobre 2018)
 Paul Biya nomme un consul général à Dubaï
 Décret N°2017/544 du 07 novembre 2017 Nomination de responsables dans les services extérieures du ministère des Relations extérieures
Diplomatie: Le Nouvel Ambassadeur du Cameroun en Turquie Accrédité
 Émirats Arabes Unis : Le Consul général prend fonction

 
Cameroon
Diplomatic missions